Asian Volleyball Championships may refer to:
 Asian Men's Volleyball Championship, the competition for men
 Asian Women's Volleyball Championship, the competition for women